John Henry Neff Jr. (September 12, 1887 – November 8, 1938) was an American football player, coach, college athletics administrator, and doctor. In 1909, he served as the head football coach at the University of Virginia, where he compiled a 7–1 record, where his team outscored opponents 155–11. From 1910 to 1911, he coached at the University of South Carolina, where he compiled a 5–8–2 record. His overall record as a college football coach stands at 12–9–2. Neff was also the athletic director at South Carolina from 1910 to 1911.

While attending the University of Virginia, Neff captained the 1907 football team. After obtaining his M.D. in 1910, Neff worked at the University of Virginia Hospital first as an intern and surgeon and then later as professor of urology. He was also a member of the Southern Surgical Association, for which he served as vice president from 1934 until his death in 1938.

Head coaching record

References

External links
 

1887 births
1938 deaths
South Carolina Gamecocks athletic directors
South Carolina Gamecocks baseball coaches
Virginia Cavaliers football coaches
Physicians from Virginia
People from Harrisonburg, Virginia